Perfluoroalkoxy alkanes (PFA) are fluoropolymers. They are copolymers of tetrafluoroethylene (C2F4) and perfluoroethers (C2F3ORf, where Rf is a perfluorinated group such as trifluoromethyl (CF3)). The properties of these polymers are similar to those of polytetrafluoroethylene (PTFE). Compared to PTFE, PFA has better anti-stick properties and higher chemical resistance, at the expense of lesser scratch resistance.

Properties
Unlike with PTFE, the alkoxy substituents allow the polymer to be melt-processed.
 On a molecular level, PFA polymers have a smaller chain length and higher chain entanglement than other fluoropolymers. They also contain an oxygen atom at the branches. This results in materials that are more translucent and have improved flow and creep resistance, with thermal stability close to or exceeding PTFE. Thus, PFA is preferred when extended service is required in hostile environments involving chemical, thermal, and mechanical stress. PFA offers high melt strength, stability at high processing temperatures, excellent crack and stress resistance and a low coefficient of friction. Similarly enhanced processing properties are found in fluorinated ethylene propylene (FEP), the copolymer of tetrafluoroethylene and hexafluoropropylene. However FEP is ten times less capable of withstanding repeated bending without fracture than PFA.

Applications
PFA is commonly used as a material for piping and as fittings for aggressive chemicals, as well as the corrosion-resistant lining of vessels in the chemical-processing industry.
Typical applications include the construction of gas scrubbers, reactors, containment vessels and piping.<ref>Dietrich Braun, [https://books.google.com/books?id=Xp0TRVDTCNAC&q=PFA%27%27Kunststofftechnik&pg=PA32 für Einsteiger], Hanser, München, 2003.</ref>
In coal-fired power plants, it is used for lining heat exchangers. By channeling crude gas through a PFA-lined apparatus, the gas stream can be cooled below its condensation temperature without damaging the heat exchanger. Its use contributes to increasing the efficiency of the whole plant.

PFA is also used to make sampling equipment in analytical chemistry and for geochemical or environmental in situ'' studies in the field, when it is particularly important to avoid chemical contamination from metallic ions at trace levels.

Production
Common trademarks include Teflon-PFA, Hostaflon-PFA and Chemfluor.

Chemours claims to be the only U.S. producer of PFA at its Fayetteville Works plant in northern Bladen County.

Environmental risks
The monomers of such Perfluoroalkoxy alkane polymers, in common with other per- and polyfluoroalkyl substances, are widespread in the environment due to human production and release of the chemicals; so durable that they are referred to as "forever chemicals"; and have detrimental health concerns not yet fully understood.

At high temperatures or in a fire, fluoroelastomers decompose and may release hydrogen fluoride. Any residue must be handled using protective equipment.

See also
 Fluoropolymer
 Perfluoroether

References

Fluoropolymers
Thermoplastics
Organofluorides